Jóhannes Kristinn Bjarnason (born 24 February 2005) is an Icelandic footballer who plays as an midfielder for Swedish club Norrköping.

Club career
He made his debut for KR as a substitute in a match against Breiðablik on 21 September 2020 when he was 15 years old. He joined Norrköping after the 2020 season along with his father who was appointed as the club's U19 coach. He made his Allsvenskan debut as a substitute in a match against Degerfors on 28 November 2021.

Personal life
His father is former international footballer Bjarni Guðjónsson. His paternal grandfather is manager Guðjón Þórðarson. His paternal uncles are former international footballers Jóhannes Karl Guðjónsson, Þórður Guðjónsson and Björn Bergmann Sigurðarson and his cousin is international footballer Ísak Bergmann Jóhannesson.

References

External links
 
 

2005 births
Living people
Johannes Kristinn Bjarnason
Johannes Kristinn Bjarnason
Association football midfielders
Johannes Kristinn Bjarnason
Allsvenskan players
IFK Norrköping players
Johannes Kristinn Bjarnason
Expatriate footballers in Sweden